Goilala refers to:

 Goilala District in Central Province, Papua New Guinea
 Goilalan languages, a group of languages in the Trans–New Guinea family